London Contemporary Dance School (informally LCDS) is a contemporary dance school located in London, England and a part of the Conservatoire for Dance and Drama. It was founded by Robin Howard in 1966 to train new dancers for his company, London Contemporary Dance Theatre.

LCDS is based at The Place in the Bloomsbury area of Central London, close to the Senate House complex of the University of London, RADA and University College London.

History
London Contemporary Dance School and its partner company, London Contemporary Dance Theatre, were founded in 1966 under the governance of the Contemporary Dance Trust. After receiving support from its founder, Robin Howard, the Contemporary Dance Trust moved to 17 Duke's Road in 1969, which it renamed The Place. In 1978, with assistance from the Arts Council and Linbury Trust, The Place underwent a major redevelopment, with new studios created for the School on Flaxman Terrace. In 1982, LCDS began offering a BA Honours degree in Contemporary Dance, validated by the University of Kent. In 1994, London Contemporary Dance Theatre was closed and the Richard Alston Dance Company formed. In October 2001 a £7.5 million redevelopment of The Place, including the construction of six new dance studios, was completed. In the same year LCDS and the Royal Academy of Dramatic Arts (RADA) formed the Conservatoire for Dance and Drama. In 2008 a £1.1 million development at The Place added two new further studios.

Teaching

LCDS teaches a variety of contemporary dance techniques including release-based, Limón, Humphrey and Contact Improvisation, priding themselves on their Graham technique and Cunningham technique. As part of its courses LCDS also offers pilates, body conditioning, free electives in Choreology, Anatomy and Scenography, and ballet studies.

LCDS provides both undergraduate and postgraduate (including EDge) vocational training as well as a research programme in contemporary dance. The School also offers courses in contemporary dance in London for adults and children, including Centre for Advanced Training, a programme allowing pre vocational training for young people in the South East.

Alumni
LCDS's first year's intake included Richard Alston, Ian Spink and Siobhan Davies who went on to perform with the main company before founding their own.  Other notable alumni of LCDS include: Richard Alston, Darshan Singh Bhuller, Seeta Indrani, Sally Potter, Liz Roche, Kenneth Tharp and Paul Liburd. Students of the School have gone on to accept contracts from a variety of prestigious dance companies including Adventures in Motion Pictures, Random Dance Company, DV8, CandoCo, Diversions and the Rambert Dance Company at the Sadler's Wells.

References

External links
 Applying to London Contemporary
 The Place website
 The Conservatoire for Dance and Drama

Educational institutions established in 1966
Performing arts education in London
Contemporary dance in London
Dance schools in the United Kingdom
1966 establishments in England